William MacDonald (c.1920 or 1921 – 1964) was a British heavyweight wrestling champion from Scotland. He was the father of actor Kenneth MacDonald (1950-2001). Kenneth was most famous for playing the role of Mike Fisher in the British sitcom Only Fools and Horses (1981-2003).

References

Scottish male wrestlers
1964 deaths
Deaths from kidney failure
Year of birth uncertain